The International Association for the Reunification of the Parthenon Sculptures is a campaign group, which joins various organizations around the world whose primary aim is to bring about the reunification of all the surviving Parthenon Sculptures to Athens, Greece.

The Association was founded in November 2005 at a meeting in Athens of twelve national reunification organisations and facilitated by the Greek government.

The current chair of the campaign, Dr. Kris Tytgat who is also chair of the Belgium Committee for the Return of the Parthenon Marbles . At the founding meeting a declaration was released which encapsulated the common goals of all the members.

The original twelve members of the Association were:
 Australians for the Reunification of the Parthenon Sculptures (Australia)
 Belgium Committee for the Return of the Parthenon Marbles (Belgium)
 Cyprus Committee for the Return of the Parthenon Marbles (Cyprus)
 German Committee for the Return of the Parthenon Marbles (Germany)
 British Committee for the Reunification of the Parthenon Marbles (Great Britain)
 Italian Committee for the Return of the Parthenon Marbles (Italy)
 International Organizing Committee - New Zealand - for the Restitution of the Parthenon Marbles (New Zealand)
 Russia Committee for the Return of the Parthenon Marbles (Russia)
 Committee for the Reunification of the Parthenon Sculptures, Serbia (Serbia)
 Spain Committee for the Return of the Parthenon Marbles (Spain)
 Swedish Parthenon Committee (Sweden)
 The American Committee for the Reunification of the Parthenon Sculptures, Inc (United States)

Other organisations joined later, bringing the total number of members to twenty one:
 Austrian Committee for the Reunification of the Parthenon Sculptures (Austria)
 Brazilian Committee for the Reunification of the Parthenon Sculptures (Brazil)
 Canadian Committee for the Restitution of the Parthenon Marbles (Canada)
 Finnish Committee the Restitution of the Parthenon Marbles (Finland)
 Marbles Reunited (Great Britain)
 Swiss Committee the Reunification of the Parthenon Marbles (Switzerland)
International Organizing Committee - Australia- for the Restitution of the Parthenon Marbles Inc. est. 1981 (Australia)

The International Association of the Parthenon Sculptures is governed by a charter and only acts based on the unanimous agreement of its members. Each member organisation appoints a delegate from among their members to represent them on the committee.

References

External links
 Official Web Site

Art and cultural repatriation
Organizations established in 2005
International organisations based in Australia
International cultural organizations
2005 establishments in Greece
Elgin Marbles